Season 2004–05 was the 121st football season in which Dumbarton competed at a Scottish national level, entering the Scottish Football League for the 99th time, the Scottish Cup for the 110th time, the Scottish League Cup for the 58th time and the Scottish Challenge Cup for the 14th time.

Overview 
The near miss in gaining promotion the previous season had ensured that there was considerable confidence in the team going into season 2004-05 to make that further step.  However, despite a successful opening spell, results were not as good as anticipated, and in December Brian Fairlie would make way for Paul Martin in the manager's seat.  There was to be no great resurgence in results and in the end a disappointing 7th place was achieved.

In the Scottish Cup, after defeating Cowdenbeath in the first round, it would be Berwick Rangers that would advance from the second round tie, after a drawn match.

In the League Cup, Ross County would prove to be too strong in the first round.

Finally, in the Scottish Challenge Cup, it was another first round exit, this time to Stirling Albion.

Locally, in the Stirlingshire Cup, Dumbarton won one and lost one of their opening group ties, and would take no further part in the competition.

Results & fixtures

Scottish Second Division

Bell's League Challenge Cup

CIS League Cup

Scottish Cup

Stirlingshire Cup

Pre-season and mid-season friendlies

League table

Player statistics

Squad 

|}

Transfers

Players in

Players out

Trivia
 The League match against Morton on 19 February marked Stephen Grindlay's 100th appearance for Dumbarton in all national competitions - the 127th Dumbarton player to reach this milestone.
 The League match against Arbroath on 26 February marked John Dillon's 200th appearance for Dumbarton in all national competitions - the 29th Dumbarton player to break the 'double century'.

See also
 2004–05 in Scottish football

References

External links
John Wight (Dumbarton Football Club Historical Archive) 
Karl Anderson (Dumbarton Football Club Historical Archive)
Gordon Herd (Dumbarton Football Club Historical Archive)
Scottish Football Historical Archive

Dumbarton F.C. seasons
Scottish football clubs 2004–05 season